Sonia Marina Clarke (born 21 June 1965), better known by her stage name Sonique, is a British singer, musician and DJ. She came to public attention as a member of dance band S'Express during the early 1990s, but achieved greater success as a solo artist in the early-to mid 2000s. During this period she achieved UK top 20 hits with "It Feels So Good", "Sky", "I Put a Spell on You" and "Can't Make Up My Mind", and won the 2001 BRIT Award for British female solo artist.

Biography

1965–1983: Early life
Sonia Clarke was born and raised in Crouch End to parents of Trinidadian descent. The first record she ever purchased was Donna Summer's "I Feel Love". When Sonique was sixteen her mother remarried and moved back to Trinidad. She refused to move with her mother and two siblings and instead stayed in London, moving into the YMCA.

1983–1991: Early music career
At the age of seventeen, a youth worker commented that she had a nice voice and suggested she use it. She put together a reggae band called 'Fari', in which she ended up writing all the music. After Fari disbanded she set about getting a recording contract.

Sonique released the single "Let Me Hold You", published by Cooltempo, in 1985. The single hit the Top 40 on the UK Dance Chart.

In 1990, she was credited for the track "Zombie Mantra", which was included on the album Set the Controls for the Heart of the Bass, the debut record of William Orbit's project Bass-O-Matic. Soon after, she teamed again with DJ Mark Moore, a few years after providing vocals for S'Express. The dance-pop duo charted in the UK Singles Chart with singles such as "Nothing to Lose". She maintained a friendship with Mark Moore after S'Express disbanded and, shortly afterwards, he gave her the gift of a set of turntables and a mixer with which she began experimenting.

1997–2001: DJ career
For three years she accompanied both Mark Moore and her childhood friend Judge Jules to their gigs. She eventually signed to London-based label Serious Records, where her first single was "I Put a Spell on You" produced by Chris Allen and ex-Wang Chung keyboardist Graeme Pleeth. She was DJ-in-residence at Club Manumission in Ibiza between 1997 and 1999.

In 1998, she came to the attention of UK promoters/label Fantazia and was asked to mix one of the discs on their album Fantazia British Anthems Summertime. The album was certified gold in the UK.

Sonique released her debut solo album Hear My Cry in 1998. Re-released in 2000, the album's hit single "It Feels So Good" topped the UK chart for three weeks in May/June of that year. After 14 weeks in the Top 40, it became the UK's third best-selling single of 2000. In 2001, after the success of "It Feels So Good" she announced that she planned to retire from the world of DJing to focus on her singing career. After finishing the album Born to Be Free, Sonique did return to DJing on a few special occasions.

2002–2006: On Kosmo
In 2004, Sonique announced she was working on a new album called On Kosmo. The first single was "Another World", which reached number 57 in Germany when released in 2004. "Why" (released Spring 2005), reached number 90 in Germany.

"Alone" was selected as the third single with which the album would be launched, but when the album got pushed back from the expected release date of February 2006, the single was cancelled. When the new release date of 29 September 2006 was announced, the track "Sleezy" was chosen as the single with which the album was to be released. However, "Sleezy" was also cancelled when the release date was pushed back once again. When On Kosmo was finally released, on Monday 13 November 2006, it failed to chart significantly in the UK. Nevertheless, Sonique was shown as a celebrity guest at 2006 edition of the World Music Awards, in London.

2009–present
In 2007, when promotional work for her previous album, On Kosmo, was finished, Sonique announced she would continue touring Europe despite the flop of the album. A teaser from some of the new material she had been working on, entitled "Better Than That", 'leaked' online on 5 October 2008. Due to the positive reception of this 'leak', the track was posted available to download on various legal MP3 download sites.

She was diagnosed with breast cancer in June 2009, for which she underwent surgery at a London clinic. Following her operations, Sonique opted to receive 5 months of chemotherapy in an effort to prevent a recurrence. She was given the all clear in 2010 and celebrated by appearing on a cover version of the Cyndi Lauper song Girls Just Want To Have Fun which was released to raise funds for the Cancer Research UK charity.

The single "World of Change" was released on 23 October 2009 and the official video was posted by Sonique's label on YouTube.

The year 2011 brought the release of the album Sweet Vibrations, which contains the previously released singles "Better Than That" and "World of Change".

Discography

Albums

Singles

Notes 

A  "I Put a Spell on You" peaked at number 36 in the United Kingdom upon its original release in 1998; it was later re-released in 2001, and served as the third single from Hear My Cry in all other territories.
B  "It Feels So Good" peaked at number 24 in the United Kingdom upon its original release in 1998; it was later re-released in 2000, and served as the first single from Hear My Cry in all other territories.

Awards and nominations
{| class=wikitable
|-
! Year !! Awards !! Work !! Category !! Result !! Ref.
|-
| rowspan=8|2000
| rowspan=4|MTV Europe Music Awards
| "It Feels So Good"
| Best Song
| 
| rowspan=4|
|-
| rowspan=5|Herself
| Best New Act
| 
|-
| Best Dance
| 
|-
| Best UK & Ireland Act
| 
|-
| NME Awards
| Best Dance Act 
| 
| 
|-
| rowspan=2|Smash Hits Poll Winners Party
| Best Dance/Soul Act
| 
| 
|-
| rowspan=5|"It Feels So Good"
| Best Dance Choon
| 
| 
|-
| The Record of the Year
| Record of the Year 
| 
|-
| rowspan=10|2001
| BMI Pop Awards
| Award-Winning Song
| 
| 
|-
| rowspan=2|Ivor Novello Awards
| International Hit of the Year 
| 
|-
| Best Selling UK Single
| 
|-
| Hungarian Music Awards
| Hear My Cry
| Best Foreign Dance Album
| 
|-
| International Dance Music Awards
| rowspan=4|Herself
| Best New Dance Artist Solo
| 
|-
| DanceStar Awards
| DanceStar of the Year
| 
|-
| rowspan=4|Brit Awards
| British Female Solo Artist
| 
| rowspan=4|
|-
| British Dance Act
| 
|-
| rowspan=2|"It Feels So Good"
| British Single of the Year
| 
|-
| British Video of the Year
|

See also
 List of artists who reached number one on the US Dance chart
 List of number-one dance hits (United States)

References

External links
 Official site
 Sonique Profile on Fantazia
 

1965 births
20th-century Black British women singers
21st-century Black British women singers
Brit Award winners
Club DJs
English dance musicians
English electronic musicians
English house musicians
English people of Trinidad and Tobago descent
English women DJs
English women in electronic music
Electronic dance music DJs
Living people
People from Crouch End
Republic Records artists
Singers from London
Universal Music Group artists
ZYX Music artists